Arvon may refer to:

Arvon Foundation
Arvon Township, Michigan
 Mount Arvon

See also
Arfon (disambiguation)